Rick Stein's Cornwall is a UK food lifestyle series which was broadcast on BBC Two in January 2021. In each half-hour episode, chef Rick Stein journeys through his home county of Cornwall, meeting suppliers, taking in the history, music, art and culture as well as trying local dishes. The second series aired in January 2022. Series three will air in February 2023.

Production 
Rick Stein's Cornwall was commissioned on 17 August 2020 by the BBC is a Rick Stein Productions and Shine TV production for BBC Two. This marked the departure from using Denham Productions, who had made many of Stein's televisions series. Filming for the series took place during September and October 2020.

Episodes

Series 1 (2021)

Series 2 (2022)

Series 3 (2023)

References

External links
 

Recipes from the series

2021 British television series debuts
2020s British cooking television series
2020s British travel television series
British cooking television shows
BBC television documentaries
BBC travel television series
English-language television shows
Television series by Banijay